Michael J. Thompson (July 22, 1877 – May 31, 1939) was once dean of American football officials, as well as a baseball umpire. He famously officiated the 1903 Carlisle-Harvard football game.

He also coached, at Washington College in Chestertown, Maryland, and at Mount St. Mary's University in Emmitsburg, Maryland. In Emmitsburg, he was later a burgess. He died unexpectedly on May 31, 1939.

Early life
Thompson was born on July 22, 1877 in Waterbury, Connecticut, to Owen Thompson and Anna Mary nee Collins. He attended the College of the Holy Cross, where he helped organize the football team. Thompson was a graduate of Georgetown University in Washington D. C., where he was the first graduate manager of athletics in 1901.

References

1877 births
1939 deaths
Baseball umpires
College football officials
Mount St. Mary's Mountaineers baseball coaches
Mount St. Mary's Mountaineers football coaches
Mount St. Mary's Mountaineers men's basketball coaches
Washington College Shoremen baseball coaches
Washington College Shoremen football coaches
Georgetown University alumni
People from Emmitsburg, Maryland
Sportspeople from Waterbury, Connecticut
Basketball coaches from Connecticut